Tigrioides nitens is a moth in the family Erebidae. It was described by Francis Walker in 1865. It is found in Australia, where it has been recorded from New South Wales, the Northern Territory and Queensland.

The forewings are pale brown.

References

Moths described in 1865
Lithosiina